Roy Hill may refer to:

 Roy Hill mine, an iron ore mine in Western Australia
 Roy Hill railway, a railway line associated with the Roy Hill mine
 Roy Hill Station, a pastoral lease in Western Australia
 Roy W. Hill, a US automobile dealer and philanthropist